Tiny Tower is a business simulation video game developed by NimbleBit, released on June 23, 2011 and November 16, 2011 for iOS and Android devices respectively. The game tasks players with managing a tower filled with virtual people, referred to as “bitizens”, with the goal of building new floors and gradually making the tower taller, which attracts bitizens to move in and work in any floor the player designates.

The game's reception has generally been positive, receiving 4.5/5 on Apple's App Store and being awarded iPhone Game of the Year by Apple in 2011.

On iOS, Tiny Tower is integrated with Apple's social gaming network, Game Center. Game Center provides achievements, leaderboards (based on the number of floors players have) and challenges sent by others. It also allows the player to compare with their Game Center friends' towers. However, Android devices are integrated with the Mobage social gaming network, and unlike Apple's Game Center, an internet connection and a Mobage user name are required to play Tiny Tower on Android.

On August 24, 2015, Mobage announced the shutdown of Tiny Tower along with five other Mobage games. The shutdown of the Android version of Tiny Tower was announced for September 24, 2015.

On May 25, 2016, NimbleBit announced the return of Tiny Tower to the app store with some new upgrades to the app including new floors, costumes, lobbies, roofs, elevators, missions, BitBook posts, and the ability to trade bitizens with friends and earn new Golden Tickets.

Gameplay

Bitizens
The lowest floor of the tower, a lobby, has an elevator, where bitizens can randomly appear. They will have a speech bubble above their head, with a number denoting which floor they would like to be taken to. If they are taken to a residential floor which has not been fully occupied, they will automatically inhabit that floor and become a resident of the tower. If they are taken to a floor that is stocking or under construction, one minute will be reduced from the remaining time.

Each bitizen has a skill level out of 9 for each category of commercial floor, showing how good they are at each type of trade. This encourages the user to tailor each bitizen to a floor they are most suited to. Each bitizen has a dream job, and the player is rewarded five "Tower Bux" for placing them in that job. Bitizens sometimes post on the "BitBook" telling the player how happy they are with their current job.

Occasionally, the player may be tasked to complete a mission, like search for a specific object or bitizen. This may be because the bitizen, for example, had ordered "some theater tickets" and that they "needed to be delivered to [name]". The game might also task you with delivering some bitizen, like “This tower is a number one tourist attraction, please deliver the tourists”. Every time a player accomplishes these tasks by tapping on the floor that the bitizen whom the player was looking for was on, he or she is rewarded "Tower Bux". Sometimes Bitizens will also Give you “free money” like, “Here’s the rent, better late than never!”

Floors
The tower grows by constructing floors, which can be either residential or commercial.  Residential floors house bitizens. Bitizens are chosen to work at a floor in the tower, and are otherwise considered unemployed.  Commercial floors sell products, which are automatically sold, even while the player is away. There are five types of commercial floors: Food, Retail, Service, Recreational, and Creative.

Each floor is decorated to resemble its real-life counterpart. Up to three products may be sold at a single floor, one per employed bitizen. All these products follow the theme of the business. With every floor, construction time is parallel to real world-time; construction time will increase as the tower gets taller. However, special VIPs can be used to speed this time up, or the player can speed it up with "Tower Bux".

Currency
In the game, there are two types of currency: coins and Tower Bux. Coins are used for the majority of purchases, often the most simple. Tower Bux are used for special functions, such as speeding up processes which would otherwise involve a waiting period. Tower Bux are not as common as coins are, and only appear randomly through active game play, or when a user purchases them with real money. Coins, on the other hand, are earned regardless of whether the player is playing or not.

VIPs
Apart from just the ordinary bitizens, there are also special bitizens called VIPs, who randomly appear in the elevator during gameplay. Originally, players were forced to use a VIP as soon as it arrived, but now up to five VIPs can be stored in the lobby at any one time, and they can kept for any period of time. VIPs have special abilities such as reducing the time taken for stocking and construction, or attracting extra customers.

A Big Spender VIP will select one item in the shop at random, and buy out the entire stock. They typically wear a green ensemble. 
A Celebrity VIP makes the first listed employee that works in the shop and is not in their dream job make that job his or her dream job. They wear a pink dress and sunglasses.
A Construction Worker VIP will knock 3 hours off the construction time of the floor they are sent to. They wear a safety orange outfit and a yellow hat.
A Delivery Man VIP will fully stock the floor in any shop the player chooses. They appear in an all-brown outfit.
A Real Estate VIP is taken to a residential floor. They will move a bitizen into each open bed on that floor, adding up to a full room of five bitizens to the player's tower. They wear blue suits.

Spin-offs

Tiny Tower Vegas is a game by NimbleBit that is a spin-off from the original Tiny Tower. In Vegas, a newly built floor has a chance to contain a special character. This character usually looks or acts like what would be expected relative to the given floor they came with. There is also the addition of various Casinos, instead of just the one in the original, simply named "Casino". Lastly, in addition to Coins and Tower Bux, there are also Poker Chips. These are used as payment to play the Casino's various games. Residential floors are hotel rooms where guests stay temporarily; potential workers spawn as 'applicants'.

Tiny Death Star is a game by NimbleBit that is a spin-off from the original Tiny Tower, themed for the Star Wars franchise. It was released in 2013 and then taken down around two years later. 

LEGO Tower is a spinoff in collaboration with LEGO and Nimblebit. It was released in the summer of 2019.

Reception

The game received a generally positive reception, with a score of 82/100 on review aggregator Metacritic. In the App Store, and the Google Play Store, Tiny Tower currently has a rating of 4.5/5 stars from user reviews.

Several reviewers commented on the addictive nature of the game; Edge stated that "returning after half a day feels like a jackpot", while Eurogamer described it as "curiously addictive". AppGamer went as far as to say that it "will take over your waking life".

Microtransactions are present in the game; small payments allowing users to purchase in-game currency which can speed the player's progress. They brought mixed response from reviewers, with Eurogamer saying "as it is, it reminds me of all the reasons I despise micro transactions". Other reviewers had less negative comments on these payments. Edge wrote that "Tiny Tower isn't defined by microtransactions: there's nothing that can't be done, given enough time", noting however that "forking out for a single 100 Bux bundle makes the first stretch so much more pleasant... it’s hard to resist."

Since its release, the game has achieved more than eight million downloads from the App Store, more than one million on the Google Play Store, and on February 7, 2012, NimbleBit announced that the game had reached 10 million total downloads.

Apple announced the game as their iPhone Game of the Year in 2011.

See also
 Pocket Planes
 Pocket Trains
 SimTower

References

External links
NimbleBit
Mobage (Replaced by DeNA)
Google Play (No longer available)
Apple App Store

2011 video games
Android (operating system) games
Construction and management simulation games
IOS games
NimbleBit games
Single-player video games
Video games developed in the United States